Florida was admitted to the Union on March 3, 1845, and elects its U.S. senators to Class 1 and Class 3. Florida's U.S. Senate seats were declared vacant in March 1861, due to its secession from the Union. They were filled again in July 1868. The state is currently represented by Republicans Marco Rubio (serving since 2011) and Rick Scott (serving since 2019). Duncan U. Fletcher was Florida's longest-serving senator (1909–1936).

List of senators

|- style="height:2em"
! rowspan=3 | 1
| rowspan=3 align=left | David Levy Yulee
| rowspan=3  | Democratic
| rowspan=3 nowrap | Jul 1, 1845 –Mar 3, 1851
| rowspan=3 | Elected in 1845.Lost re-election.
| rowspan=3 | 1
| 
| rowspan=2 | 1
| rowspan=2 | Elected in 1845.Retired.
| rowspan=2 nowrap | Jul 1, 1845 –Mar 3, 1849
| rowspan=2  | Democratic
| rowspan=2 align=right | James Westcott
! rowspan=2 | 1

|- style="height:2em"
| 

|- style="height:2em"
| 
| rowspan=3 | 2
| rowspan=3 | Elected in 1848.Retired.
| rowspan=3 nowrap | Mar 4, 1849 –Mar 3, 1855
| rowspan=3  | Whig
| rowspan=3 align=right | Jackson Morton
! rowspan=3 | 2

|- style="height:2em"
! rowspan=5 | 2
| rowspan=5 align=left | Stephen Mallory
| rowspan=5  | Democratic
| rowspan=5 nowrap | Mar 4, 1851 –Jan 21, 1861
| rowspan=3 | Elected in 1851.
| rowspan=3 | 2
| 

|- style="height:2em"
| 

|- style="height:2em"
| 
| rowspan=4 | 3
| rowspan=3 | Elected in 1855.Withdrew.
| rowspan=3 nowrap | Mar 4, 1855 –Jan 21, 1861
| rowspan=3  | Democratic
| rowspan=3 align=right | David Levy Yulee
! rowspan=3 | 3

|- style="height:2em"
| rowspan=2 | Re-elected in 1857.Withdrew.
| rowspan=4 | 3
| 

|- style="height:2em"
| rowspan=2 

|- style="height:2em"
| rowspan=5 colspan=3 | Vacant
| rowspan=5 nowrap | Jan 21, 1861 –Jun 17, 1868
| rowspan=5 | Civil War and Reconstruction.
| rowspan=6 | Civil War and Reconstruction.
| rowspan=6 nowrap | Jan 21, 1861 –Jun 25, 1868
| rowspan=6 colspan=3 | Vacant

|- style="height:2em"
| 
| rowspan=3 | 4

|- style="height:2em"
| rowspan=5 | 4
| 

|- style="height:2em"
| 

|- style="height:2em"
| rowspan=3 
| rowspan=5 | 5

|- style="height:2em"
! rowspan=2 | 3
| rowspan=2 align=left | Adonijah Welch
| rowspan=2  | Republican
| rowspan=2 nowrap | Jun 17, 1868 –Mar 3, 1869
| rowspan=2 | Elected to finish term.Retired.

|- style="height:2em"
| rowspan=3 | Elected to finish term.Retired.
| rowspan=3 nowrap | Jun 25, 1868 –Mar 3, 1873
| rowspan=3  | Republican
| rowspan=3 align=right | Thomas W. Osborn
! rowspan=3 | 4

|- style="height:2em"
! rowspan=3 | 4
| rowspan=3 align=left | Abijah Gilbert
| rowspan=3  | Republican
| rowspan=3 nowrap | Mar 4, 1869 –Mar 3, 1875
| rowspan=3 | Elected in 1868 or 1869.Retired.
| rowspan=3 | 5
| 

|- style="height:2em"
| 

|- style="height:2em"
| 
| rowspan=3 | 6
| rowspan=3 | Elected in 1872 or 1873.Retired.
| rowspan=3 nowrap | Mar 4, 1873 –Mar 3, 1879
| rowspan=3  | Republican
| rowspan=3 align=right | Simon B. Conover
! rowspan=3 | 5

|- style="height:2em"
! rowspan=6 | 5
| rowspan=6 align=left | Charles W. Jones
| rowspan=6  | Democratic
| rowspan=6 nowrap | Mar 4, 1875 –Mar 3, 1887
| rowspan=3 | Elected in 1875.
| rowspan=3 | 6
| 

|- style="height:2em"
| 

|- style="height:2em"
| 
| rowspan=3 | 7
| rowspan=3 | Elected in 1879.
| rowspan=7 nowrap | Mar 4, 1879 –Mar 3, 1891
| rowspan=7  | Democratic
| rowspan=7 align=right | Wilkinson Call
! rowspan=11 | 6

|- style="height:2em"
| rowspan=3 | Re-elected in 1881.Retired.
| rowspan=3 | 7
| 

|- style="height:2em"
| 

|- style="height:2em"
| 
| rowspan=4 | 8
| rowspan=4 | Elected in 1885.

|- style="height:2em"
| colspan=3 | Vacant
| nowrap | Mar 4, 1887 –May 19, 1887
|  
| rowspan=5 | 8
| rowspan=2 

|- style="height:2em"
! rowspan=9 | 6
| rowspan=9 align=left | Samuel Pasco
| rowspan=9  | Democratic
| rowspan=9 nowrap | May 19, 1887 –Apr 18, 1899
| rowspan=4 | Elected late to finish term in 1887.

|- style="height:2em"
| 

|- style="height:2em"
| rowspan=2 
| rowspan=4 | 9
| Legislature failed to elect.
| nowrap | Mar 4, 1891 –May 26, 1891
| colspan=2 | Vacant

|- style="height:2em"
| rowspan=3 | Elected late in 1891.Retired.
| rowspan=3 nowrap | May 26, 1891 –Mar 3, 1897
| rowspan=3  | Democratic
| rowspan=3 align=right | Wilkinson Call

|- style="height:2em"
| rowspan=4 | Appointed to begin next term as legislature had failed to elect.Elected in 1893 to finish term.
| rowspan=4 | 9
| 

|- style="height:2em"
| 

|- style="height:2em"
| rowspan=2 
| rowspan=6 | 10
| Legislature failed to elect.
| nowrap | Mar 4, 1897 –May 13, 1897
| colspan=3 | Vacant

|- style="height:2em"
| rowspan=5 | Elected late in 1897.
| rowspan=8 nowrap | May 14, 1897 –Dec 23, 1907
| rowspan=8  | Democratic
| rowspan=8 align=right | Stephen Mallory II
! rowspan=8 | 7

|- style="height:2em"
| Appointed to begin next term as legislature had failed to elect.Lost election to finish term.
| rowspan=5 | 10
| rowspan=3 

|- style="height:2em"
| colspan=3 | Vacant
| nowrap | Apr 18, 1899 –Apr 20, 1899
|  

|- style="height:2em"
! rowspan=10 | 7
| rowspan=10 align=left | James Taliaferro
| rowspan=10  | Democratic
| rowspan=10 nowrap | Apr 20, 1899 –Mar 3, 1911
| rowspan=3 | Elected to finish Pasco's term.

|- style="height:2em"
| 

|- style="height:2em"
| 
| rowspan=7 | 11
| rowspan=3 | Appointed to begin the term as legislature had failed to elect.Elected in 1903 to finish term.Died.

|- style="height:2em"
| rowspan=7 | Appointed to begin the term as legislature had failed to elect.Re-elected in 1905 to finish term.Lost re-election.
| rowspan=7 | 11
| 

|- style="height:2em"
| rowspan=5 

|- style="height:2em"
|  
| nowrap | Dec 23, 1907 –Dec 26, 1907
| colspan=3 | Vacant

|- style="height:2em"
| Appointed to finish Mallory's term.Died.
| nowrap | Dec 26, 1907 –Mar 22, 1908
|  | Democratic
| align=right | William James Bryan
! 8

|- style="height:2em"
|  
| nowrap | Mar 22, 1908 –Mar 27, 1908
| colspan=3 | Vacant

|- style="height:2em"
| Appointed to finish Mallory's term.Retired.
| nowrap | Mar 27, 1908 –Mar 3, 1909
|  | Democratic
| align=right | William Hall Milton
! 9

|- style="height:2em"
| 
| rowspan=3 | 12
| rowspan=3 | Appointed to begin the term.Elected in 1909 to finish the term.
| rowspan=16 nowrap | Mar 4, 1909 –Jun 17, 1936
| rowspan=16  | Democratic
| rowspan=16 align=right | Duncan U. Fletcher
! rowspan=16 | 10

|- style="height:2em"
! rowspan=3 | 8
| rowspan=3 align=left | Nathan P. Bryan
| rowspan=3  | Democratic
| rowspan=3 nowrap | Mar 4, 1911 –Mar 3, 1917
| rowspan=3 | Appointed to begin the term.Elected in 1911 to finish the term.Lost renomination.
| rowspan=3 | 12
| 

|- style="height:2em"
| 

|- style="height:2em"
| 
| rowspan=3 | 13
| rowspan=3 | Re-elected in 1914.

|- style="height:2em"
! rowspan=10 | 9
| rowspan=10 align=left | Park Trammell
| rowspan=10  | Democratic
| rowspan=10 nowrap | Mar 4, 1917 –May 8, 1936
| rowspan=3 | Elected in 1916.
| rowspan=3 | 13
| 

|- style="height:2em"
| 

|- style="height:2em"
| 
| rowspan=3 | 14
| rowspan=3 | Re-elected in 1920.

|- style="height:2em"
| rowspan=3 | Re-elected in 1922.
| rowspan=3 | 14
| 

|- style="height:2em"
| 

|- style="height:2em"
| 
| rowspan=3 | 15
| rowspan=3 | Re-elected in 1926.

|- style="height:2em"
| rowspan=3 | Re-elected in 1928.
| rowspan=3 | 15
| 

|- style="height:2em"
| 

|- style="height:2em"
| 
| rowspan=8 | 16
| rowspan=4 | Re-elected in 1932.Died.

|- style="height:2em"
| Re-elected in 1934.Died.
| rowspan=8 | 16
| rowspan=6 

|- style="height:2em"
| colspan=3 | Vacant
| nowrap | May 8, 1936 –May 26, 1936
|  

|- style="height:2em"
! rowspan=3 | 10
| rowspan=3 align=left | Scott Loftin
| rowspan=3  | Democratic
| rowspan=3 nowrap | May 26, 1936 –Nov 3, 1936
| rowspan=3 | Appointed to continue Trammell's term.Successor elected.

|- style="height:2em"
|  
| nowrap | Jun 17, 1936 –Jul 1, 1936
| colspan=3 | Vacant

|- style="height:2em"
| Appointed to continue Fletcher's term.Retired when successor qualified.
| nowrap | Jul 1, 1936 –Nov 3, 1936
|  | Democratic
| align=right | William Luther Hill
! 11

|- style="height:2em"
! rowspan=6 | 11
| rowspan=6 align=left | Charles O. Andrews
| rowspan=6  | Democratic
| rowspan=6 nowrap | Nov 4, 1936 –Sep 18, 1946
| rowspan=3 | Elected to finish Trammell's term.
| rowspan=2 | Elected to finish Fletcher's term.
| rowspan=10 nowrap | Nov 4, 1936 –Jan 3, 1951
| rowspan=10  | Democratic
| rowspan=10 align=right | Claude Pepper
! rowspan=10 | 12

|- style="height:2em"
| 

|- style="height:2em"
| 
| rowspan=3 | 17
| rowspan=3 | Re-elected in 1938.

|- style="height:2em"
| rowspan=3 | Re-elected in 1940.Died.
| rowspan=5 | 17
| 

|- style="height:2em"
| 

|- style="height:2em"
| rowspan=3 
| rowspan=5 | 18
| rowspan=5 | Re-elected in 1944.Lost renomination.

|- style="height:2em"
| colspan=3 | Vacant
| nowrap | Sep 18, 1946 –Sep 25, 1946
|  

|- style="height:2em"
! rowspan=13 | 12
| rowspan=13 align=left | Spessard Holland
| rowspan=13  | Democratic
| rowspan=13 nowrap | Sep 25, 1946 –Jan 3, 1971
| Appointed to finish Andrews's term.

|- style="height:2em"
| rowspan=3 | Elected in 1946.
| rowspan=3 | 18
| 

|- style="height:2em"
| 

|- style="height:2em"
| 
| rowspan=3 | 19
| rowspan=3 | Elected in 1950.
| rowspan=9 nowrap | Jan 3, 1951 –Jan 3, 1969
| rowspan=9  | Democratic
| rowspan=9 align=right | George Smathers
! rowspan=9 | 13

|- style="height:2em"
| rowspan=3 | Re-elected in 1952.
| rowspan=3 | 19
| 

|- style="height:2em"
| 

|- style="height:2em"
| 
| rowspan=3 | 20
| rowspan=3 | Re-elected in 1956.

|- style="height:2em"
| rowspan=3 | Re-elected in 1958.
| rowspan=3 | 20
| 

|- style="height:2em"
| 

|- style="height:2em"
| 
| rowspan=3 | 21
| rowspan=3 | Re-elected in 1962.Retired.

|- style="height:2em"
| rowspan=3 | Re-elected in 1964.Retired.
| rowspan=3 | 21
| 

|- style="height:2em"
| 

|- style="height:2em"
| 
| rowspan=4 | 22
| rowspan=3 | Elected in 1968.Retired and resigned early.
| rowspan=3 nowrap | Jan 3, 1969 –Dec 31, 1974
| rowspan=3  | Republican
| rowspan=3 align=right | Edward Gurney
! rowspan=3 | 14

|- style="height:2em"
! rowspan=11 | 13
| rowspan=11 align=left | Lawton Chiles
| rowspan=11  | Democratic
| rowspan=11 nowrap | Jan 3, 1971 –Jan 3, 1989
| rowspan=4 | Elected in 1970.
| rowspan=4 | 22
| 

|- style="height:2em"
| rowspan=2 

|- style="height:2em"
| Appointed to finish Gurney's term, having been elected to the next term.
| rowspan=4 nowrap | Jan 1, 1975 –Dec 31, 1980
| rowspan=4  | Democratic
| rowspan=4 align=right | Richard Stone
! rowspan=4 | 15

|- style="height:2em"
| 
| rowspan=4 | 23
| rowspan=3 | Elected in 1974.Lost renomination and resigned early.

|- style="height:2em"
| rowspan=4 | Re-elected in 1976.
| rowspan=4 | 23
| 

|- style="height:2em"
| rowspan=2 

|- style="height:2em"
| Appointed to finish Stone's term, having been elected to the next term.
| rowspan=4 nowrap | Jan 1, 1981 –Jan 3, 1987
| rowspan=4  | Republican
| rowspan=4 align=right | Paula Hawkins
! rowspan=4 | 16

|- style="height:2em"
| 
| rowspan=3 | 24
| rowspan=3 | Elected in 1980.Lost re-election.

|- style="height:2em"
| rowspan=3 | Re-elected in 1982.Retired.
| rowspan=3 | 24
| 

|- style="height:2em"
| 

|- style="height:2em"
| 
| rowspan=3 | 25
| rowspan=3 | Elected in 1986.
| rowspan=9 nowrap | Jan 3, 1987 –Jan 3, 2005
| rowspan=9  | Democratic
| rowspan=9 align=right | Bob Graham
! rowspan=9 | 17

|- style="height:2em"
! rowspan=6 | 14
| rowspan=6 align=left | Connie Mack III
| rowspan=6  | Republican
| rowspan=6 nowrap | Jan 3, 1989 –Jan 3, 2001
| rowspan=3 | Elected in 1988.
| rowspan=3 | 25
| 

|- style="height:2em"
| 

|- style="height:2em"
| 
| rowspan=3 | 26
| rowspan=3 | Re-elected in 1992.

|- style="height:2em"
| rowspan=3 | Re-elected in 1994.Retired.
| rowspan=3 | 26
| 

|- style="height:2em"
| 

|- style="height:2em"
| 
| rowspan=3 | 27
| rowspan=3 | Re-elected in 1998.Retired.

|- style="height:2em"
! rowspan=10 | 15
| rowspan=10 align=left | Bill Nelson
| rowspan=10  | Democratic
| rowspan=10 nowrap | Jan 3, 2001 –Jan 3, 2019
| rowspan=3 | Elected in 2000.
| rowspan=3 | 27
| 

|- style="height:2em"
| 

|- style="height:2em"
| 
| rowspan=4 | 28
| rowspan=3 | Elected in 2004.Resigned.
| rowspan=3 nowrap | Jan 3, 2005 –Sep 9, 2009
| rowspan=3  | Republican
| rowspan=3 align=right | Mel Martínez
! rowspan=3 | 18

|- style="height:2em"
| rowspan=4 | Re-elected in 2006.
| rowspan=4 | 28
| 

|- style="height:2em"
| rowspan=2 

|- style="height:2em"
| Appointed to finish Martínez's term.Retired.
| nowrap | Sep 9, 2009 –Jan 3, 2011
|  | Republican
| align=right | George LeMieux
! 19

|- style="height:2em"
| 
| rowspan=3 | 29
| rowspan=3 | Elected in 2010.
| rowspan=10 nowrap | Jan 3, 2011 –Present
| rowspan=10  | Republican
| rowspan=10 align=right | Marco Rubio
! rowspan=10 | 20

|- style="height:2em"
| rowspan=3 | Re-elected in 2012.Lost re-election.
| rowspan=3 | 29
| 

|- style="height:2em"
| 

|- style="height:2em"
| 
| rowspan=4 | 30
| rowspan=4 | Re-elected in 2016.

|- style="height:2em"
| colspan=3 | Vacant
| nowrap | Jan 3, 2019 –Jan 8, 2019
|  
| rowspan=4 | 30
| rowspan=2 

|- style="height:2em"
! rowspan=3 | 16
| rowspan=3 align=left | Rick Scott
| rowspan=3  | Republican
| rowspan=3 nowrap | Jan 8, 2019 –Present
| rowspan=3 | Elected in 2018.Delayed his inauguration to finish his term as Governor of Florida.

|- style="height:2em"
| 

|- style="height:2em"
| 
| rowspan=3 | 31
| rowspan=3 | Re-elected in 2022.

|- style="height:2em"
| rowspan=3 colspan=5 | To be determined in the 2024 election.
| rowspan=3 | 31
| 

|- style="height:2em"
| 

|- style="height:2em"
| 
| 32
| colspan=5 | To be determined in the 2028 election.

See also

 List of United States representatives from Florida
 United States congressional delegations from Florida
 Elections in Florida

References

 Party Division in the Senate, 1789-Present, via Senate.gov
 
 

 
Florida
United States Senators